Vaine Greig (born 11 December 1991) is a New Zealand rugby union player. She represented New Zealand at the 2013 Rugby World Cup Sevens in Russia.

Greig attended St Peter's College. She was named in the Black Ferns sevens team for the 2013 Amsterdam Sevens.

References 

1991 births
Living people
New Zealand female rugby union players
New Zealand female rugby sevens players
New Zealand women's international rugby sevens players
People educated at St Peter's College, Palmerston North